Theodore Roosevelt Birthplace National Historic Site is a recreated brownstone at 28 East 20th Street, between Broadway and Park Avenue South, in the Flatiron District of Manhattan, New York City. It is a replica of the birthplace and childhood home of 26th president of the United States, Theodore Roosevelt.

History
The house that originally stood on the site was built in 1848 and was bought by the Roosevelts in 1854. Theodore Roosevelt was born there on October 27, 1858, and lived in the house with his family until 1872, when the neighborhood began to become more commercial and the family moved uptown to 57th Street.

The original building was demolished in 1916 to make way for retail space, but upon the death of Roosevelt in 1919 the lot was purchased and the house rebuilt by the Women's Roosevelt Memorial Association, which eventually merged with the Roosevelt Memorial Association in 1953 to form the Theodore Roosevelt Association. Noted female American architect Theodate Pope Riddle was given the task of reconstructing a replica of the house, as well as designing the museum, situated next door, that serves to complete the site.  The row house next door at number 26, which was a twin to the Roosevelts', was used as a model, and some architectural elements from it were incorporated into the replica.  The twin house was demolished to make space for the museum.  The restoration recreates the house as it was in 1865.

The house was rededicated in 1923 and was subsequently refurbished with many furnishings from the original house by the President's widow, Edith, and his two sisters. The widow and sisters also supplied information about the interior's appearance during Roosevelt's residency.

The Theodore Roosevelt Association donated the birthplace to the National Park Service in 1963. As a National Historic Site, it was automatically listed on the National Register of Historic Places at its creation on October 15, 1966. It now serves as a museum dedicated to the life and contributions of the 26th president of the United States.

Roosevelt's recollection
Roosevelt described his memories of the home's interior in Chapter 1 of his 1913 autobiography:

Architecture
The three-story brownstone house features a mansard roof, and a high stoop above the basement.  The hooded moldings above the windows and doorway are in the Gothic Revival style.

In 2014, Theodate Pope Riddle was recognized for her work rebuilding the home, a winning site of Built by Women New York City, a competition launched by the Beverly Willis Architecture Foundation during the fall of 2014 to identify outstanding and diverse sites and spaces designed, engineered and built by women.

See also
List of museums and cultural institutions in New York City
List of New York City Designated Landmarks in Manhattan from 14th to 59th Streets
National Register of Historic Places listings in Manhattan from 14th to 59th Streets
Presidential memorials in the United States

References
Notes

Sources
 The National Parks: Index 2001–2003. Washington: U.S. Department of the Interior

External links

Official NPS website

Birthplace
1962 establishments in New York City
Biographical museums in New York City
Birthplaces of individual people
Buildings and monuments honoring American presidents in the United States
Flatiron District
Historic house museums in New York City
Houses completed in 1848
Houses in Manhattan
Houses on the National Register of Historic Places in Manhattan
Museums in Manhattan
National Historic Sites in New York (state)
National Park Service National Monuments in New York City
New York City Designated Landmarks in Manhattan
Presidential homes in the United States
Presidential museums in New York (state)
Protected areas established in 1962
Theodore
Tourist attractions in Manhattan